Łagiewniki  is a village in the administrative district of Gmina Włocławek, within Włocławek County, Kuyavian-Pomeranian Voivodeship, in north-central Poland.

Part of Łagiewniki was formerly known locally as Nowy Jork (Polish for New York), from a nickname given by the parish priest in the 1950s, perhaps due to its distance from the village centre or its perceived prosperity. This name came to be listed in the official records of place names, and was among the 365 names changed or delisted by the Polish Ministry of Internal Affairs with effect from 1 January 2010. The delisting of Nowy Jork attracted nationwide television and press coverage.

References

Villages in Włocławek County